The 7th century letter of Ali ibn Abi Talib to Malik al-Ashtar was sent by the Islamic leader Ali to Malik al-Ashtar, a loyal supporter who served as the governor of Egypt. The letter advises Malik al-Ashtar how to treat the people of Egypt justly. It has come to be seen by some as a model of just Islamic governance.

It is the 53rd letter in Nahj al-Balagha.

Background
At the time, Muhammad ibn Abi Bakr was the governor of Egypt. Amr ibn al-As, one of Mu'awiyah's companions, wanted to become the governor of Egypt. So he rallied 6,000 soldiers and headed towards Egypt. After learning this, Muhammad ibn Abi Bakr wrote a letter to Ali seeking support. Ali wrote back assuring him that he would send his best general and one of his closest companions, Malik al-Ashtar. Ali then added: "Malik, may Allah have mercy on you, go to Egypt. I have absolute trust in you. Rely on Allah! Use gentleness in its place and intensity in its place." 

In 658 CE, after the Battle of Siffin, Ali installed Malik as Governor of Egypt and ordered Muhammad ibn Abi Bakr to return to Ali's capital city, Kufa. 

Ali later said of Malik al-Ashtar: "Verily, Malik was to me as I was to the Prophet."

Context
According to Robert Gleave, in this letter Ali "outlines his conception of legitimate and righteous rule" and advises Malik al-Ashtar to implement the Sharia, not purely as a means of social control but as a path to religious awakening and the spiritual wellbeing of the community."

With its focus on justice, Ali's letter is seen by some as a model for good governance and some Shia assert that the letter reflects Ali's own profound wisdom.

He described his purpose thus: "God; my Lord! you know that our goal of rebellion is not a love of power and access to the world's increasing comfort and it is only for the purpose that brought back your religion's signs to where it was and reforms your cities to be safe your oppressed servants and brought back your lost." Muhammad Jawad Mughniyah, a Shia jurist in Beirut, believes that the letter provides a constitution that is universally applicable. In the letter, Imam Ali advised Malik al-Ashtar to take care of people in power and those who follow them. Mughniyah wrote that Ali's order is expressed in controlling over the means of production and regulating five – seven or ten-year programs for taking care of the general welfare.
Ali wrote:

Letter
Ali's letter makes the following points on the responsibilities of a leader:

 He should be a fair governor for his staff and citizens
 He should choose the most qualified yet virtuous, honest, truthful, and pious men for his administration
 He must be just 
 He must punish back-biters and scandal-mongers
 He must supervise the activities of his staffs and be sure that justice and social equality are observed at any situation
 He should consult with his staff and not issue authoritative orders made solely by himself
 He should fight against corruption, injustice and evil usages of authority against citizens
 He should pay attention to any fault in his officers as long as he knows and takes it
 He should keep regular and persistent communications with his governors, commissioners, etc
 He should avoid self-admiration and self-appreciation
 He should not take for himself or his relatives any common property or in which others have equal rights

Other advice includes ensuring that, if the people accuse you of excess, apologize to them and be truthful because this will bring relief for the people and healing in the soul; doing good to those in need; being companions with the needy in public; being humble before God; keeping a military presence to a minimum.

Transmission

Asbagh bin Nabata copied Ali's letter, then other copies were made by various Muslim scholars including Nasr ibn Mazahim, Jahiz Basari, Syed Razi, Ibn Abi'l-Hadid and Mustafa Bek Najib, the Egyptian scholar.

See also
Nahj al-Balagha
List of Shia books

Reference

External links 
 
 
 

Ali
Medieval Arabic literature
Shia hadith collections
Islamic sermons